Smbat VII Bagratuni (died 25 April 775) was an Armenian noble of the Bagratuni (Bagratid) family. He and his brother Vasak were the sons of Ashot III Bagratuni. He served as presiding prince of Armenia in 761–775, playing a leading role in the Armenian rebellion of 774–775 against the Abbasid Caliphate. He was killed in the Battle of Bagrevand. He was the father of Ashot Msaker, who restored the family's fortunes in the early 9th century.

775 deaths
8th-century kings of Armenia
8th-century Armenian people
Bagratuni dynasty
Armenian rebels
Monarchs killed in action
Vassal rulers of the Abbasid Caliphate
Princes of Armenia